Attorney General Saunders may refer to:

John R. Saunders (1869–1934), Attorney General of Virginia
Phil Saunders (1920–1997), Attorney General of South Dakota
Romulus Mitchell Saunders (1791–1867), Attorney General of North Carolina